Amemiya (written: 雨宮) is a Japanese surname. Notable people with the surname include:

Corinne Kaoru Amemiya Watanabe (born 1950), American judge
, Japanese photographer
Kazumi Amemiya, Japanese voice actor
, Japanese anime director and character designer
, Japanese economist
, Japanese artist

See also
RE Amemiya, a Japanese automotive tuning company

Japanese-language surnames